The laughingthrushes are a family, Leiothrichidae, of Old World passerine birds. They are diverse in size and coloration. These are birds of tropical areas, with the greatest variety in Southeast Asia and the Indian subcontinent.  The entire family used to be included in the Old World babbler family Timaliidae.

Characteristics

They are small to medium-sized birds. They have strong legs, and many are quite terrestrial. They typically have generalised bills, similar to those of a thrush. Most have predominantly brown plumage, with minimal difference between the sexes, but many more brightly coloured species also exist.

This group is not strongly migratory, and most species have short rounded wings, and a weak flight. They live in lightly wooded or scrubland environments, ranging from swamp to near-desert. They are primarily insectivorous, although many will also take berries, and the larger species will even eat small lizards and other vertebrates.

Taxonomy
The family Leiothrichidae was introduced (as a subfamily Leiotrichanae) by the English naturalist William Swainson in 1832. A comprehensive molecular phylogenetic study of the family published in 2018 led to substantial revision of the taxonomic classification. The laughingthrushes in the genus Garrulax were found to belong to three separate clades that had diverged in the Miocene 7-9 million year ago. The genus was therefore split with Garrulax restricted to one clade and the genera Pterorhinus and Ianthocincla resurrected for the other two clades. The genus Turdoides was also split and species moved into the resurrected genus Argya.

In a separate change, the crocias were moved to the genus Laniellus Swainson, 1832 which has priority over Crocias Temminck, 1836.

The cladogram below is based on a study of the babblers by Tianlong Cai and collaborators published in 2019.

The cladogram below shows the  phylogenetic relationships between the genera in the family Leiothrichidae based on a study by Alice Cibois and collaborators published in 2018.

List of genera
The family contains 133 species in 16 genera:
 Grammatoptila – striated laughingthrush
 Cutia – cutias (2 species)
 Laniellus – crocias (2 species)
 Trochalopteron – laughingthrushes (19 species)
 Actinodura – barwings and minlas (9 species)
 Montecincla – laughingthrushes (4 species)
 Minla –  red-tailed minla
 Leioptila – rufous-backed sibia
 Leiothrix  – (2 species)
 Liocichla - liocichlas (5 species) 
 Heterophasia - sibias (7 species)
 Argya  – mainly babblers (16 species) – previous placed in Turdoides
 Turdoides – babblers (19 species)
 Garrulax – laughingthrushes (14 species)
 Ianthocincla – laughingthrushes (8 species) – previously placed in Garrulax
 Pterorhinus – laughingthrushes and babaxes (23 species) – previously placed in Garrulax

References

 
Bird families
Sylvioidea